is a New Zealand company law case, also relevant for UK company law, decided by the Privy Council. The common-law principles will have influence in jurisdictions with similar laws.

Facts
Meridian was part of a syndicate bidding to take over NZ company, Euro National Corp Ltd. Mr Koo and Mr Ng, working for Meridian, bought 49% of Euro’s shares. But Meridian failed to disclose to the Securities Commission of New Zealand that they had become a ‘substantial security holder’ of over 5% because Koo and Ng wanted to hide the transaction from their superiors. The Commission imposed fines against Koo, Ng and the Meridian. The company argued it was not liable because it had not known about it.

Heron J held Meridian knew it was a substantial property holder, because as employees the knowledge of Koo and Ng was attributable to the company. The NZ Court of Appeal held that Koo’s knowledge should be attributable because he was the ‘directing mind and will’ of the company. Meridian argued that was only the board, not Koo.

Advice
Lord Hoffmann for the Privy Council advised that ‘there would be little sense in deeming such a persona ficta to exist unless there were also rules to tell one what acts were to count as acts of the company. It is therefore a necessary part of corporate personality that there should be rules by which acts are attributed to the company. These may be called ‘the rules of attribution’. There can be rules in the constitution or rules implied (e.g. shareholders acting unanimously are the company, Multinational Gas). Otherwise, the principles of agency apply, and the company acts through its servants and agents.

See also

UK company law
Corporate manslaughter
Imputation (law)
Russian Commercial and Industrial Bank v Comptoir d'Estcompte de Mulhouse [1923] 2 KB 630

Notes

References

External links
 Meridian's website (based in Bermuda)

United Kingdom company case law
Judicial Committee of the Privy Council cases on appeal from New Zealand
1995 in New Zealand law
1995 in case law